Afroditi Frida is a Greek singer, best known for representing Greece in the ESC 1988.

Biography
Frida was born and raised in Athens in 1964. She studied music for eight years in the National Conservatory of Athens and started her career in 1984. That year she was among the 10 finalists who competed for representing Greece in the Eurovision Song Contest. Her song, "Donald Duck", did not win. Frida returned to the Greek selection for the ESC in 1988. She sang, Clown, a modern pop song accompanied by three dancers. The Greek jury stated that none of the songs were good enough to represent the country in the contest, but eventually they voted for the Clown.

The Greek delegation travelled to Dublin without high hopes. Frida seemed nervous, the dancers seemed out of rhythm and the clown who appeared on stage made this Greek entry one of the most hilarious entries ever. The song was eventually ranked 17th with only Turkey and France voting for it.

In 1989, Frida had her debut album and in 1995 started to work with Xenia Dikaiou and Nancy Kanelli – the sister of the notorious journalist and member of the greek parliament, Liana Kanelli. Kanelli wrote three songs for Frida.

Throughout her career, Frida has worked with many famous Greek singers including (Marinella, Haris Alexiou, and others) and now she is making appearances on small music stages around Athens.

Discography

 1989–Mikri Megali Agapi (Small Great Love)
 1992–Na Proseheis (Take Care)
 1995–Tin Ora pou Koimountai ta Thiria (The Time that the Monsters are Asleep)
 2006–Asimenia Dakria (Silver Tears)

References
 Official website

Living people
Singers from Athens
20th-century Greek women singers
Eurovision Song Contest entrants for Greece
Eurovision Song Contest entrants of 1988
Year of birth missing (living people)